Brennisteinsfjöll ("Sulfur mountains") is a minor volcanic system, with crater rows and small shield volcanoes on the Reykjanes Peninsula in southwest Iceland.

Geography

Brennisteinfjöll are not high. The highest mountain is Vífilsfell with 655 m.

Geology

Position within Iceland’s volcano-tectonic environment
In Iceland there are about 32 volcanic systems. Volcanic system means a volcano-tectonic fissure system and – very often a bigger volcano, a so-called central volcano which in most cases is a stratovolcano and may contain a caldera. Brennisteinsfjöll does not include such a central volcano. The existence of the fissure systems in Iceland is explained by its situation, located on top of the Mid-Atlantic Ridge, a divergent plate boundary. There is most probably also a magmatic hot spot under the island which stands for increased magma production.

Brennisteinsfjöll is one of four (some scientists say five) volcanic systems on the big peninsula of Reykjanes in Southwest Iceland, as such the system forms part of the Reykjanes Volcanic Belt. These others are: Reykjanes volcanic system, around Gunnuhver at the tip of the peninsula, which mostly includes Svartsengi with the geothermal power station and the Blue Lagoon; to the east of the Reykjanes system is the Krýsuvík (volcanic system), including the geothermal areas around Seltún, Krýsuvík and Trölladyngja (Reykjanes) as well as lake Kleifarvatn; and to the northeast of the Brennisteinsfjöll lies the Hengill volcanic system which reaches out to the northeast over the lake Þingvallavatn to Þingvellir.

These volcanic systems are arranged en echelon and in a ca. 45° angle to the direction of rifting, scientists define this as an oblique arrangement. The volcanic systems of Reykjanes, Brennisteinsfjöll included, are stretched out in northeast-southwesterly direction over the rift on the peninsula.

General description of the Brennisteinsfjöll volcanic system
Most to the south are the Stóra Eldborg crater row and to the north Nyðri Eldborg. The volcanic system was the most productive of all the volcanic systems of the Reykjanes peninsula during the Holocene with 30-40 eruptions and around 10 since the settlement of Iceland in the 9th century.

Eruptions and current situation
One of the bigger lava flows of the system run south from Brennisteinsfjöll to the coast at Herdísarvík bay forming lava falls on their way. Previously it was thought that this lava flow had ceased before the settlement of Iceland (i.e. the end of the 8th century), but this is now thought that this was not the case as the coastal trail (now Route 42) was covered in lava at one stage.

The last eruption in the Brennisteinsfjöll volcanic system was a VEI-2 eruption in 1341.

It is a possible cause of St. Mary Magdalene’s flood 1342 in Central Europe und following bad years with Black Death to 1350.
Brennisstein is the word for sulfur on Iceland, so great sulfur emissions with worldwide cooling for some years are possible and quite normal by this volcanic system.

Most of its rocks consist of basalt.

Brennisteinsfjöll geothermal areas
Fumaroles are to be found within an area of a few acres, and two more areas show signs of hydrothermal alteration. The surface conditions are complicated with a rough lava surface and the geothermal features which are located at a height of  can only be reached on foot. The stratigraphy of the region includes hyaloclastite, older and younger lava flows.

In a fault, not far from Grindarskörð , there are traces of a former geothermal area which is no more active.

Sulfur mining
As the name (Brennisteinsfjöll = Sulfur Mountains) suggests, sulfur is found here, though today in small amounts. But in the 19th century, a sulfur mine was run in the region by people from the United Kingdom. Mining was carried out just til the 1880s.

The mine was situated in a lava slope. The sulfur “was deposited into holes and fractures in the lava and between lava layers”. It was therefore difficult to reach and mine. The miners had first to break up the lava to get to the sulfur. The current geothermal activity is above this area.

The place of the former mine can be found by hiking the old trail Selvogsgata  and the following the so-called Draugahlíðar  between the lava and the slope. There are still some ruins of the former mine and traces of transportation paths.

Known mountains, craters and other volcanic landforms
Part of the Brennisteinsfjöll volcanic system are the Brennisteinsfjöll themselves (up on Hellisheiði), not really a mountain range, more some hills and crater rows, and the Bláfjöll mountain massif. The system includes two shield volcanoes, Heiðin há and Leitin. Among the many smaller subglacial mounds, tuyas, craters and eruptive vents are Stóra-Kóngsfell, Drottning, the Þríhnúkagígar crater trio – now famous because it is possible to see a magmatic feeder system from the inside -, and some craters named Eldborg (e.g. Eldborg í Bláfjöllum and Stóra-Eldborg undir Geitahlíð). The rootless cones of Rauðhólar near Reykjavík are also connected to a lava flow from this volcanic system.

Nature protection in Brennisteinsfjöll
Some protected areas are to be found in the region of Brennisteinsfjöll. These are Herdísarvík Nature Reserve, Reykjanes Country Park, Bláfjöll Country Park and the two Natural Monuments Eldborgir undir Geitahlíð and Eldborg í Bláfjöllum.

See also
 Geology of Reykjanes Peninsula
 Krýsuvík (volcanic system)

External links

Volcanism of Brennisteinsfjöll
 Brennsteinsfjöll in the Catalogue of Icelandic Volcanoes
 
 Huang Maochang: Possible environmental impacts of drilling exploratory wells for geothermal development in the Brennisteinsfjöll area, SW-Iceland. United National University. Geothermal Training Programme. Reports 2001, no.5.

Volcano monitoring
 https://en.vedur.is/earthquakes-and-volcanism/earthquakes/reykjanespeninsula/ Icelandic Met Office (IMO). Earthquake Monitoring. Reykjanes Peninsula
https://en.vedur.is/earthquakes-and-volcanism/volcanic-eruptions/  IMO. Aviation Color Code

References

Volcanoes of Iceland
VEI-2 volcanoes
Reykjanes
Volcanic systems of Iceland
Reykjanes Volcanic Belt
Brennisteinsfjöll Volcanic System